Frank Torvald Baude (6 July 1936 – 4 February 2021) was a Swedish politician and bricklayer who was chairman of the Communist Party Marxist-Leninists (the revolutionaries), KPML(r), from 1970 to 1998.

In April 2014 Baude announced that he was leaving the Communist Party due to having lost trust in both the party leadership and the editorial staff of Proletären, the party's newspaper. His departure was confirmed by then party chairman Robert Mathiasson.

Baude died at Sahlgrenska University Hospital in Gothenburg on 4 February 2021, after suffering a heart attack.

References 

1936 births
2021 deaths
Leaders of political parties in Sweden
Swedish communists
Anti-revisionists
Politicians from Gothenburg